Jacob Cornelisz Schout (c.1600 – after 1627), was a Dutch Golden Age member of the Haarlem schutterij.

Biography
He was born in Haarlem as the son of the judge Cornelis Jacobsz Schout, and was a flag bearer of the white brigade (and therefore bachelor) of the St. George militia in Haarlem from 1612-1627. He was portrayed three times in schutterstukken: by Frans Hals in The Banquet of the Officers of the St George Militia Company in 1616, by Pieter de Grebber in 1619, and again by Hals in The Banquet of the Officers of the St George Militia Company in 1627. He was succeeded as a flag bearer by Pieter Schout.

He died in Haarlem.

References

Jacob Cornelisz Schout in De Haarlemse Schuttersstukken, by Jhr. Mr. C.C. van Valkenburg, pp. 68, Haerlem : jaarboek 1958, ISSN 0927-0728, on the website of the North Holland Archives

1600s births
1630s deaths
Frans Hals
People from Haarlem